John Henry Haines Root (October 17, 1908 – November 17, 1991) was an Ontario farmer and political figure. He represented Wellington North and then Wellington—Dufferin in the Legislative Assembly of Ontario from 1951 to 1975 as a Progressive Conservative member.

He was born in Erin Township, Ontario, the son of David Oscar Root. With his brother Haines, Root ran the family farm and also operated a trucking business to transport livestock and farm supplies. In 1932, he married Lillie Matilda Toop. He served on the local school board and was a Mason. Root served in the provincial cabinet as Minister Without Portfolio from 1958 to 1961. He retired from politics in 1975. He was named to the Ontario Water Resources Commission in 1961 and later served as its chairman.

References 
 Canadian Parliamentary Guide, 1968, PG Normandin

External links 

History of Erin Township
John Henry Haines Root's obituary

1908 births
1991 deaths
Progressive Conservative Party of Ontario MPPs
Canadian Baptists
20th-century Baptists